Mesaieed (also transliterated as Musay'id and Umm Sa'id) is an industrial city in Al Wakrah Municipality in the State of Qatar, approximately  south of Doha. It was one of the most important cities in Qatar during the 20th century, having gained in recognition as a prime industrial zone and tanking center for petroleum received from Dukhan.

Both Mesaieed and its industrial area are administered by a subdivision of QatarEnergy called "Mesaieed Industry City Management", which was established in 1996.

Etymology
According to The Centre for Geographic Information Systems of Qatar, the city derives its name from a plant known locally as "sead" which previously grew in bountiful quantities in the area.

History
Mesaieed was established in 1949 as a tanker terminal by QatarEnergy on a previously uninhabited site along the coast. It was chosen by the company because of its proximity to the working population in Doha and Al Wakrah and because of the depth of its waters. It was the only deepwater port in Qatar for more than 20 years.

Administration

It was administered wholly by QatarEnergy at the time of its inception. After QatarEnergy transferred its headquarters from Dukhan to Mesaieed in 1956, they undertook substantial development on workers' camps and facilities. The government had agreed to the company's request to allow it full jurisdiction over the area, and additionally, until the 1960s, the government had prioritized the development of Doha rather than its oil and natural gas industry. The rapid growth of oil and natural gas revenues in the 1960s and the accession of Khalifa bin Hamad Al Thani in 1972 resulted in the government assuming a portion of control over the area.

In 1997, Mesaieed Municipality was formed from the areas of Mesaieed Industrial Area, Mesaieed and Shagra. It was dissolved in 2006 and reincorporated in the municipality of Al Wakrah.

When free elections of the Central Municipal Council first took place in Qatar during 1999, Mesaieed was designated the constituency seat of constituency no. 11. It would remain constituency seat in the next three consecutive elections until the fifth municipal elections in 2015 when it was merged into constituency no. 20. In the inaugural municipal elections in 1999, Mohammed Hamad Al Shawi Al Marri won the elections, receiving 48.8%, or 60, of the votes. Runner-up that year was Saud Al Awad Al Dosari, who was trailing with 41.5%, or 51, of the votes. Mansour Salem Al-Hajri was elected in the 2002 elections. For the third municipal elections in 2007, Saeed Ali Al-Marri was elected constituency representative. Al-Marri successfully retained his seat in the 2011 elections.

Geography
It is a part of the Al Wakrah Municipality. Other distances include Al Wakrah – 21 km away, Umm Salal Ali – 63 km away, Madinat ash Shamal – 143 km away, Al Khor – 93 km away, and Dukhan – 74.6 km away.

The eastern section is situated over a low, rocky promontory which is enclosed by sabkhas on the coast. The southern portion of Mesaieed is characterized by sand dunes. To the northeast of the coast, where the residential section is located, there are sandy hillocks which lie 9 m above sea level. Roughly 262 hectares of mangroves are found around Mesaieed's coastline.

The residual soils are overlain with aeolian deposits. It lies on limestone bedrock, which is found at depths 0.25 m to 8 m above sea level. The industrial area's strategic location and the high water table helps ensure that Mesaieed's groundwater remains unpolluted.

Furthermore, the waters had an average pH of 7.87, a salinity of 52.47 psu, an average temperature of 22.91°C and 5.47 mg/L of dissolved oxygen.

Climate 
According to the Qatar Meteorology Department, until February 2017, Mesaieed held the record for the lowest recorded temperature in Qatar, measuring in at 3.8 degrees Celsius in January 1964. This record was broken when 1.5 degrees Celsius was documented in Abu Samra in February 2017.

The following is climate data for Mesaieed obtained from the Qatar Statistics Authority.

Industrial area

Mesaieed is an industrial city and is managed by Mesaieed Industrial City, a subsidiary of QatarEnergy. All the industry concentrated in the city constitutes the core of Qatar's industry.

The industrial area accommodates the main plants of the following companies:

Developments

As part of the Qatari government's National Vision 2030, a $7.4 bn project was launched in 2010 to construct a major port strategically located near Mesaieed Industrial Area's port.

Tourism

Tourism is confined to Mesaieed's desert areas, primarily to the immediate southeast of the city. Beach resorts on Mesaieed's coast are considered to be among the most important tourist areas in the country. The main tourist resort is Sealine Beach Resort, which has a hotel, villas and water sports facilities. 

The sand dunes on the eastern coast are known as 'singing sands' because of the sounds they produce.

Al Afjah Heritage Village is a cultural attraction located on the western boundaries of Mesaieed.

Telecommunications
The Mesaieed central switchboard was completed in 1978 with a capacity of 3,000 lines. According to government statistics, the total number of telephones installed in 1980 was 405. Qatar National Telephone Services carried out substantial development on the telephone system the next year, resulting in a nearly two-fold increase to 808 telephones.

Transport

The first roads in Mesaieed were constructed in the late 1940s by Qatar Petroleum (today Qatar Energy). They were paved in 1955. The roads fell into disrepair in the 1960s, and in 1968 the government assumed responsibility for developing the road system from Mesaieed to Al Wakrah. In 1977, a road system scheme was designed by William L. Perreira & Associates and work was commenced the same year by the Public Works Authority.

There is a cheap public bus service from Mesaieed to Al Ghanim Bus Station in Doha within every 30 minutes.

Currently, the elevated Mesaieed Metro Station is under construction, having been launched during Phase 2B. Once completed, it will be part of Doha Metro's Red Line South.

Infrastructure

Mesaieed opened its first government health clinic in late 1975.

The Mesaieed Master Plan was devised in 2006 and its contents guide the city's development over a 25-year period from 2006 until 2030. It outlines the distribution of land for public and private infrastructure, such as power, petrochemical industries, non-petrochemical industries, residential units, green belts, shipping and waste disposal.

There are five banks active in Mesaieed: Qatar Islamic Bank (QIB), Doha Bank, Qatar National Bank (QNB), Commercial Bank Qatar (CBQ) and The Hongkong and Shanghai Banking Corp (HSBC). HSBC is located inside a state-of-the-art post office (the second largest in Qatar). The QNB branch, established in 1974, was one of the bank's first branches inaugurated outside the confines of Doha.

Adjacent to the shopping centre is a large souq or market known as Souq Mesaieed. The souq comprises both residential units and commercial spaces and occupies an area of 45,576 m2. As of 2021 there are over 100 businesses located in the souq, ranging from salons and laundry services to restaurant and cafes. Also included within the souq are 70 units of commercial offices.

Sports

Mesaieed Endurance Track, located in the desert, played host to the endurance riding competition in the 2006 Asian Games. The track was also host to the 2013 CHI Al Shaqab endurance races.

There is a sports complex in Mesaieed which hosts national sports tournaments organized by QatarEnergy.

Mesaieed Hockey Club
The MHC was established in Oct 2011 by players from various companies. Since then, the club has taken part in various tournaments organized by the Qatar Hockey Federation (QHF). The club joined the Qatar Hockey League in the 2013 season.

Al Banush Club

Owned by QAFCO, Al Banush Club is used primarily by high-ranking staff members of QAFCO. It is the most sizable club in Mesaieed and hosts many recreational facilities such as a main hall, a football ground, tennis and basketball courts, a swimming pool and restaurants. The annual QAFCO flower and vegetable show is held on its football ground. A cricket field is located near the club.

QAPCO Club
It is owned by QAPCO. Inaugurated in 2013, it is one of the largest clubs in the city. Its facilities include a football field, basketball, tennis, badminton and table tennis facilities, a swimming pool and a bowling arena.

QP Golf Club
QP Golf Club is owned by QatarEnergy and was founded in 1951. It accommodates one of the only two golf courses in Qatar, and a swimming pool. The golf course is the oldest in Qatar, dating back to at least 1955. It underwent expansion in 1959.

Education
The following schools are located in Mesaieed:

Demographics

The first time an official government census was conducted was in 1986. According to population estimates, the population in 1953 was no more than 500. This increased to over 2,500 in 1960, after QatarEnergy had shifted their headquarters from Dukhan to Mesaieed. Thereafter, the company took initiatives to decrease the population of the city and industrial area, resulting in a population of around 2,000 in 1976. In 1982, the population increased to approximately 5,800 people, of whom 4,900 were employed in industrial services.

Registered live births
The following table is a breakdown of registered live births by nationality and sex for Mesaieed. Places of birth are based on the home municipality of the mother at birth.

References

External links

Qatar Fuel Additives Co. (QAFAC)

Cities in Qatar
Populated places in Al Wakrah
Populated coastal places in Qatar